Pennsboro can refer to:

Pennsboro, Missouri
East Pennsboro Township, Pennsylvania
West Pennsboro Township, Pennsylvania
Pennsboro, West Virginia